Risberget is a village in Grue Municipality in Innlandet county, Norway. The village is located west of Kirkenær, on the other side of the river Glomma.

References

Grue, Norway
Villages in Innlandet